Divorce is a 1923 American silent drama film directed by Chester Bennett and starring Jane Novak, John Bowers and James Corrigan.

Cast
 Jane Novak as Jane Parker
 John Bowers as Jim Parker
 James Corrigan as George Reed
 Edythe Chapman as Mrs. George Reed
 Margaret Livingston as Gloria Gayne
 Freeman Wood as Townsend Perry
 George McGuire as Tom Tucker
 George Fisher as Winthrop Avery
 Philippe De Lacy as 'Dicky' Parker

References

Bibliography
 Munden, Kenneth White. The American Film Institute Catalog of Motion Pictures Produced in the United States, Part 1. University of California Press, 1997.

External links
 

1923 films
1923 drama films
1920s English-language films
American silent feature films
Silent American drama films
American black-and-white films
Films directed by Chester Bennett
Film Booking Offices of America films
1920s American films